Granaz Moussavi  (Persian : گراناز موسوی ) is an Iranian-Australian contemporary poet, film director and screenwriter. She is known for her avant-garde poetry in the 1990s. Her debut feature film My Tehran for Sale (2009) is an internationally-acclaimed Australian-Iranian co-production.

Early life and education 
Granaz was born in Tehran. Her father, Hashem Moussavi, was a well-known sound engineer in Iranian National TV (Jaam-e Jam) and in the film industry, and her mother, Parvin Chegini Farahani, was a video grader. 

She went to Razi primary school and Hadaf high school in Tehran. 

Her love for cinema and theatre changed her mind about tertiary schooling. She withdrew from a B.S. at Alzahra University and took various drama courses in Tehran, focusing on acting. These included Hamid Samandarian's drama workshops at the Theatre Organization of Tehran, and Mahin Oskoui's underground acting classes held in her apartment.

In 1997, Granaz emigrated to Australia with her family, where she changed her focus from acting to screen studies and filmmaking. In 2002, she made her honors film A Short Film About Colour, shot by the renowned Iranian cinematographer Firooz Malekzadeh. The short film earned Granaz the best director award from Flinders University in Adelaide, and an honorary membership to the Australian Screen Directors Authorship Collecting Society (ASDAS).

Writing  
At the age of 17, Granaz started writing professionally as a book reviewer and literary critic at "Donyaye Sokhan literary magazine (مجلهٔ ادبی دنیای سخن") in Tehran. 

Her first poems were published in 1989, and since then, she has continued writing and publishing poetry in various magazines and collections in Iran and other countries. 

Granaz published her first book, Khatkhati Rooye Shab خط خطی روی شب (Sketching On Night), underground in Tehran in 1996, to an extensive reception. 

Her second book, Paberahneh Ta Sobh پابرهنه تا صبح (Barefoot Till Morning), was the winner of جایزه شعر کارنامه یاجایزه شعر امروز ایران  Karnameh’s best poetry book of the year award in 2001 and went to at least a fourth edition. She published her third collection, Avazhaye Zan e Biejazeh آوازهای زن بی اجازه  (The Songs of the Forbidden Woman), in 2003. A second edition was published. 

Her poems have been anthologized worldwide and her solo bi-lingual collection was published in France by MEET publishers.

Granaz published Les Rescapes De La Patience (translated by Farideh Rava and with a preface by Jean Baptiste Para) after a sponsored literary residency in Saint Nazaire, France. 

In 2004 a DEA thesis at Sorbonne University (Paris III)  on her poetry was lodged by Etienne Forget.

After receiving an Honours degree from Flinders University, Granaz got accepted into AFTRS, the Australian Film, Television, and Radio School in Sydney. She graduated with a postgraduate degree in film editing in 2006. She was a doctoral candidate with a scholarship at the University of Western Sydney researching "The Aesthetics of Poetic Cinema". She has made several short films and documentaries and has participated in various roles in a few feature films. 

In the field of poetry, she has conducted many poetry readings worldwide, including her participation in the Paris Autumn Festival in 2000 (introduced and translated by Media Kashigar, managed by Alain Lance), SOAS/London University in 2001, Vienna and Mondorf/Luxembourg in 2003, Saint Nazaire, Nantes, Marseille, Arles/France in 2004–5, Sydney/Australia in 2005, “Caravan of poetry” through Paris, La Rochelle, Marseille, Poitier, and Nantes/France in 2006, the Fifth International Festival of Poetry “Merci Poesie”, Göteborg/Sweden in 2008, the Iranian Arts and Literature Festival, San Francisco/USA in 2009, and Luxemburg in 2009. She gave a lecture followed by a poetry reading at Stanford University in February 2009 and University of California at Irvine in January 2011.

Much has been written about Granaz's poetry, including by some renowned Iranian writers and critics such as M. Azad, Jalil Doustkhah, Mohammad Rahim Okhovat, Shahrnoush Parsipour, and Ali Babachahi. Her poetry has been translated and published in French, English, Swedish, Spanish, Portuguese, and Kurdish. In 2006, being shortlisted in local, statewide, and across-the-country competitions, she won the Holding Redlich prize for her script "pitch" at the Screen Producers Association of Australia. Her prize was a sponsorship for her trip to Cannes Film Festival in 2007 to present her project idea in the film market. Her first feature film My Tehran for Sale (tehran-e-man, haraj تهران من، حراج ), a 2009 production, was shot in July/Aug 2008 in Tehran. The film, written and directed by Granaz, is the first feature collaboration of Iran and Australia. It premiered at the Adelaide Film Festival, and was an official selection of Toronto International Film Festival in September 2009, Vancouver International Film Festival, Pusan International Film Festival (October 2009) and International Filmfestival Mannheim-Heidelberg (November 2009), The Museum of Modern Art (MoMA) New York (January 2010), International Film Festival Rotterdam (January 2010), International Film Festival Prague - Febiofest, 2010 Cinema Novo Film Festival Brugges, 2010 CPH:PIX Copenhagen International Film Festival, 2010 Guadalajara International Film Festival Mexico, Sydney Travelling Film Festival, Las Palmas de Gran Canaria International Film Festival, HRAFF 2010, Fukuoka International Film Festival 2010, Global Lens USA 2010 and Dialogue of Cultures Film Festival New York 2011.

My Tehran for Sale is the winner of Independent spirit Inside Film Awards 2009. It won the jury award for best feature Film at the TriMedia Film Festival in 2010.

When Pomegranates Howl was nominated for the 14th Annual Asia Pacific Screen Awards as the Best Youth Feature Film.

Awards and recognition
 Best Director Award, Flinders University, 2002
 Jury Award for Best Feature Film at the TriMedia Film Festival, 2010
 Moussavi was the jury for 60th International Filmfestival Mannheim-Heidelberg (Germany) 2011, as well as Independent Spirit IF Award 2010 (Australia).

Filmography
   2020                 When Pomegranates Howl 

	2008                 My Tehran for Sale, a feature film (as writer/director/produced by Cyan Films) an official selection of Toronto International Film Festival (Sep,2009), winner of Independent spirit Inside Film Awards 2009
	2008                 Into Pieces, a video art.
	2007                 Rats Sleep at Night, a short drama.
	2006                 1001 Nights, a documentary on Persian poetry in exile.
	2005                 Narrative Theatre Workshop, a 5-hour video, Producer: Relationships S.A
	2004                 Just Tenants of the Earth, a 30 minutes documentary on young refugees and migrants in Australia
	2004                 A Slice Of Tehran Girls, a 30-minute documentary on young girls in Tehran.
	2002                 A Short Film About Colour, a 10-minute short fiction, Honours production, Flinders University.
	2002                 An uncompleted documentary on Woomera detention center.
	 2000                A Letter to a Friend, an 8-minute documentary, University of S.A.
	 1999                The Restroom, an 8-minute doco-drama, Flinders University.
	 1999                 Smoke, a 27-second advertisement.

as Editor:

	 2006                  Love On Track, a 4 minutes drama, Director: Alison Heather.
	 2005                  Karma, 3 minutes experimental short film, Director: Josh Tylor, AFTRS.
	 2005                  Look Sharp, an 8 minutes drama, Director: Amy Gebhardt, AFTRS. Winner of Best student film at The International Melbourne Film Festival.
	 2005                  Rock! I gave you the best years of my life, a 6 minutes documentary, Director: Mathew Walker, AFTRS.
	 2003-2004        Turtles Can Fly, A feature film by Bahman Ghobadi, Tehran-Iran & Kurdistan-Iraq. (on-set digital editing)

Bibliography/Other Publications

 1997        Sketching On Night (Graffiti On Night) “ خط خطی روی شب ”, Tehran
 2000        Barefoot Till Morning "پابرهنه تا صبح "  was the winner of Karnameh’s best poetry book of the year award in 2001, Tehran
 
 2006        Les Rescapes De La Patience, France
 2011        Red Memory "حافظه قرمز", Australia
 2012        Canto di Una Donna Senza Permesso, Italy

Further reading

References

External links
 Biography of the Author, Granaz Moussavi at the Australian Centre for the Moving Image
 My Tehran For Sale
Trailer
 VOA interview
 GRANAZ MOUSSAVI: Biography - Asia Specific Screen Awards
 Granaz Moussavi's list of published books
 Toronto International Film Festival/My Tehran For Sale
 Vancouver International Film Festival/My Tehran For Sale
 Moussavi's Film Review at The Hollywood Reporter
 Screendaily Review
 Indiewire interview
 The Age review 
 When Pomegranates Howl Nomination
 Granaz Moussavi, IMDb

1976 births
Iranian women film directors
Iranian film directors
20th-century Iranian poets
Persian-language poets
Iranian women writers
Iranian writers
Living people
Women screenwriters
Al-Moussawi family
Persian-language women poets
Western Sydney University alumni
21st-century Iranian poets